Guraidhoo may refer to the following places in the Maldives:
 Guraidhoo (Kaafu Atoll)
 Guraidhoo (Laamu Atoll)
 Guraidhoo (Thaa Atoll)